Lycée Franco-Bolivien Alcide d'Orbigny is a French international school in La Paz, Bolivia. The school serves primaire (primary school), through the final year of lycée (senior high school), terminale.

The school has a statue of its namesake, French naturalist Alcide d'Orbigny.

References

External links
  Lycée Franco-Bolivien
  Lycée Franco-Bolivien

International schools in La Paz
French international schools in Bolivia